Pamisos is a former municipality in the Karditsa regional unit, Thessaly, Greece. Since the 2011 local government reform it is part of the municipality Mouzaki, of which it is a municipal unit. The municipal unit has an area of 53.854 km2. Population 3,787 (2011). The seat of the municipality was in Agnantero. The municipal unit Pamisos consists of the following communities:
 Agnantero
 Kranea
 Magoula
 Palaiochori
 Rizovouni

References

Populated places in Karditsa (regional unit)

el:Δήμος Μουζακίου#Παμίσου